"Come Next Monday" is a song co-written by American country music singer K. T. Oslin.  It was originally recorded by Judy Rodman on her 1986 album Judy.

Oslin's recording was released in September 1990 as the second single from her album Love in a Small Town.  The single went to number one for two weeks and spent a total of 20 weeks on the country singles chart. It would turn out to be her final single to reach number one on that chart. Oslin wrote the song with Charlie Black and Rory Bourke.

Critical reception
Lisa Smith and Cyndi Hoelzle of Gavin Report reviewed the single favorably, stating that it was "another intelligent, feeling song from a wise woman's point of view. Of course, both men and women should relate to the self-promises in this song."

Chart performance

Year-end charts

References

1990 singles
K. T. Oslin songs
Songs written by Rory Bourke
RCA Records Nashville singles
Songs written by K. T. Oslin
Judy Rodman songs
Songs written by Charlie Black
1986 songs